The Sovereign Grant Act 2011 (c. 15) is the Act of the Parliament of the United Kingdom which introduced the Sovereign Grant, the payment which is paid annually to the monarch by the government in order to fund the monarch's official duties. It was the biggest reform to the finances of the British royal family since the inception of the Civil List in 1760.

Background 

In 1760, King George III agreed with Parliament that he was no longer to govern in person, and therefore was no longer entitled to income from the Crown Estate, which for 700 years had always been used for the administration of the state. Parliament passed the Civil List Act 1760 which granted a fixed annual income from the Civil List. The resulting system required the annual state expenditure on the monarchy to be decided by the Treasury and presented to House of Commons. Prior to abolition, the Civil List was fixed at £7.9 million annually for the decade 2001–2010, the same amount as in 1991, with the reserve being consumed over the decade. In 2011 the Civil List was raised to £13.7 million.

There were four funding sources:
 The Civil List paid by the Exchequer
 The Grant-in-Aid for Royal Travel paid by the Department for Transport
 The Grant-in-Aid for Communications and Information paid by the Department for Culture, Media and Sport
 The Grant-in-Aid for the Maintenance of the Royal Palaces paid by the Department for Culture, Media and Sport

Legislation 
The Act came into force on 1 April 2012, the start of the financial year, and changed the arrangements for the funding of the Queen’s official duties. The Act consolidated all four funding sources into a single payment, called the Sovereign Grant. The current system is intended to be a more permanent arrangement than the previous one, which was reign-specific.

The Sovereign Grant is paid annually by HM Treasury at a value indexed as a percentage of the revenues from the Crown Estate and other revenues in the financial year two years earlier. It is based on an index percentage which was initially set at 15% and this is reviewed every five years by the Royal Trustees (the Prime Minister, the Chancellor of the Exchequer and the Keeper of the Privy Purse).

Any unspent Sovereign Grant is put into a reserve fund. The level of the Sovereign Grant is protected by law from decreasing as a result of falling Crown Estate revenues. In addition, the legislation requires that the Sovereign Grant shall not rise to such a level that the Reserve Fund becomes more than half the level of annual expenditure. Annual financial accounts are published by the Keeper of the Privy Purse and audited by the National Audit Office, making the Sovereign Grant more accountable than its predecessor. Funding to the Royal Household is treated similarly to funding for other government departments, unlike previous Civil List payments.

Finances 
Since its inception, the Sovereign Grant has often risen each year at a rate higher than the rate of inflation. About a third of the grant is used to tackle the backlog in property maintenance at the Royal Palaces. Following the 2016 review of the percentage of the Crown Estate income used to calculate the grant, it was announced that a temporary increase in the Sovereign Grant would be used to fund a £369 million refurbishment of Buckingham Palace, subject to parliamentary approval. The trustees recommended that the percentage should rise to 25% for the 10 years during which the work would take place, and that the grant should then be returned to 15% when building work is finished in 2027. This was expected to result in a 66% rise in the grant in 2017–18. The increase in the grant to 25% was approved by Parliament in March 2017.

A decrease in the Crown Estate's rental income during the COVID-19 pandemic led to the first use of the provision that prevents the value of the Sovereign Grant from falling, with the Treasury committing to make up the shortfall. In January 2023 the Keeper of the Privy Purse, on behalf of King Charles III, asked the government to reduce the percentage used to calculate the sovereign grant so that the total does not include the income from new offshore wind power leases, calculated to be worth around £1 billion annually to the Crown Estate. This request was said by the King to be due to his desire that the money could instead be used for the "wider public good".

The King and the Prince of Wales also receive private income through the Duchy of Lancaster and Duchy of Cornwall. The Sovereign Grant only accounts for one part of the total cost of running the monarchy. The Sovereign Grant does not cover the costs of police and military security and of armed services ceremonial duties nor does it cover the costs of royal ceremonies or local government costs for royal visits.

Notes

United Kingdom Acts of Parliament 2011
British monarchy
Monarchy and money